Solasta: Crown of the Magister is a role-playing video game developed by Tactical Adventures and released in 2021.  It is based on the 5th edition Dungeons & Dragons rules, which it uses via the System Reference Document.

Gameplay 
Solasta: Crown of the Magister is a tactical role-playing game with turn-based combat.  It is set in a fantasy world that was nearly destroyed in an apocalyptic event a thousand years ago.  Players create a party of four adventurers to search the ruins of an Elven empire for the jewels needed to empower a powerful artifact.  Players can use pre-made characters or make their own.  Each character has their own personality and can answer questions by non-player characters or engage in banter with the other party members.  Character creation follows the fifth edition Dungeons & Dragons rules and includes five races and seven classes.  The plot is generally linear.

Development 
Tactical Adventures is an independent studio based in Paris that was founded by Mathieu Girard, formerly of Amplitude Studios. They announced Kickstarter funding for Solasta: Crown of the Magister in September 2019. The game entered early access in October 2020 and was released for Microsoft Windows on May 27, 2021.  The macOS version was released on November 4, 2021.  The Primal Calling downloadable content released at the same time adds two new playable classes, along with 3 subclasses for each. Primal Calling also adds one ancestry and a new character background . The game was later ported to consoles on Xbox One and Xbox Series X/S on July 5, 2022.

Reception 
Solasta: Crown of the Magister received "generally favorable reviews" on Metacritic, where it has a 77/100 score.  Rick Lane of PC Gamer rated it 70/100.  Lane criticized the writing but praised its tactical combat and accessibility to newcomers.  Writing for RPGamer, Phillip Willis called it an excellent introduction to both D&D and role-playing games, though he said the story is too cliched.  Willis rated it 3.5/5 stars and concluded that it "provides a fun, if somewhat short, ride that most will enjoy".  Abraham Kobylanski of RPGFan wrote, "Solasta's combat and systems make for an excellent foundation, but until it gets a compelling story, it will feel a bit empty."

References

External links 
 

2021 video games
Role-playing video games
Fantasy video games
Video games set on fictional planets
Video games developed in France
Windows games
MacOS games
Single-player video games
Indie video games